Alexandria Governorate is one of the governorates of Egypt. The city of Alexandria was historically the capital of Egypt until the foundation of Fustat, which was later absorbed into Cairo. Today the Alexandria governorate is considered second in importance after the Cairo Governorate. It is located in the northern part of the country, directly on the Mediterranean Sea, making it one of the most important harbours in Egypt.

Along with Cairo, Port Said and Suez, Alexandria is one of four governorates in the country that are also municipalities. The governorate capital is the city of Alexandria, the second largest city in Egypt. Alexandria governorate lies along the Mediterranean coast and stretch for about 70 km northwest of the Nile Delta. The governorate is bounded by the Mediterranean Sea in the north, El Behera governorate in the south and the east and Matrouh governorate in the west. The total area size of Alexandria governorate is almost 2818 km2. It has the most important harbour in Egypt and it is the second largest urban governorate in the country with population more than four and half million (4,799,740 in March 2015) and population density of 1700 square kilometres according to the Central Agency for Public Mobilization and Statistics (CAPMAS). Alexandria has a unique geographical location and a mild climate. It is also considered an industrial governorate where 40% of Egyptian industries are concentrated, especially chemicals, food, spinning and weaving as well as petrol industries and fertilizers.

Demographics

Municipal divisions
The governorate is divided into municipal divisions with a total estimated population as of July 2017 of 5,179,034.

Industrial zones
According to the Egyptian Governing Authority for Investment and Free Zones (GAFI), in affiliation with the Ministry of Investment (MOI), the following industrial zones are located in this governorate:
New Manshia 
Al Nasseria 
Upper and Lower Mergham 
The industrial zone in K 31, Desert Road
Seibco 
Ajami 
Al Nahda and its expansions
Ohm Zagheou 
 New Borg El Arab

Tourism 
Alexandria is known with its diverse history as it was occupied by several cultures throughout the years. Several monuments nowadays shape Alexandria's historic sites.

Monuments 
 Bibliotheca Alexandrina 
 Citadel of Qaitbay
 Graeco-Roman Museum
 Alexandria National Museum
 Royal Jewelry Museum
 Serapeum
 Pompey's Pillar
 Roman Amphitheatre
 Lighthouse of Alexandria

Gardens 
 Al Montaza Gardens
 Al Shallalat Gardens
 Antoniadis Garden
 El-Nozha Garden
 International Park of Alexandria

Education 
Alexandria Governorate follows the Egyptian Educational System in its public schools and universities.

Most notable educational institutes 
 Bibliotheca Alexandrina ( Alexandria Library)
 Alexandria University
 International Branch of Alexandria University
 Borg El Arab Technological University
 Senghor University
 Arab Academy for Science, Technology, and Maritime Transport
 Egypt-Japan University of Science and Technology in New Borg El Arab city.
 City of Scientific Research and Technological Applications
 Pharos University
 The Higher Institute For Engineering And Technology In King Marriott

Sports 
The governorate of Alexandria has several sports clubs that represents the governorate such as:
 El Ittihad Alexandria Club
 Egyptian Olympic Athletes Club
 Smouha Sporting Club
 Alexandria Sporting Club
Alexandria governorate most common sport is football and holds three main stadiums which are:
 Borg El Arab Stadium
 Alexandria Stadium
 Haras El-Hedoud Stadium

Former governors 
Alexandria Governorate has had several governors throughout the years, below is listed the former governors since 1952 up to 2017:
 Counselor. Mohammed Mustafa Kamal Dib. ( From April 10, 1952 to January 5, 1957)
 Mr. Mahmoud Ismael Mehanna. ( From March 4, 1957 to September 10, 1960)
 Major. Sedeek Abdul Latif. ( From October 8, 1960 to November 12, 1961)
 Mr. Mohammed Hamdi Ashour. ( From November 12, 1961 to October 27, 1968)
 Major. General. Ahmed Kamel. ( From November 6, 1968 to November 17, 1970)
 Major. Mamdouh Salem. ( From November 18, 1970 to May 13, 1971)
 Dr. Ahmed Fouad Muhyiddin. ( From May 8, 1971 to September 7, 1972)
 Prof. Abdel Moneim Wehbe. ( From September 8, 1972 to May 28, 1974)
 Major General. Ahmed Abdel Tawab Hdaib. ( From May 29, 1974 to November 27, 1978)
 Prof. Mohamed Fouad Hilmi. ( From November 28, 1978 to May 14, 1980)
 Prof. Naim Mustafa Abu Talib. ( From May 15, 1980 to August 23, 1981)
 Mr. Mohammed Saeed Al-Mahi. ( From August 24, 1981 to May 17, 1982)
 Major General. Mohamed Fawzy Maaz. ( From May 18, 1982 to June 9, 1986)
 Counselor. Ismail El-Gawsaqi. ( From July 10, 1986 to July 8, 1997)
 Major General. Mohamed Abdel Salam Mahgoub. ( From July 9, 1997 to August 28, 2006)
 General. Adel Labib. ( From August 2006 to February 2011)
 Dr. Essam Salem. ( From April 3, 2011 to July 2011)
 Dr. Osama Foley. ( From August 4, 2011 to July 2012)
 Counselor. Mohamed Atta Abbas. ( From September 4, 2012 to June 1, 2013)
 Counselor. Maher Mohamed Zahir Baybars. ( From June 16, 2013 to August 12, 2013)
 General. Tarek Mahdy. ( From August 13, 2013 to February 6, 2015)
 Mr Hany El-Mesiry. ( From February 7, 2015 to October 25, 2015)
 Engineer Mohamed Ahmed Abd-El-Zaher. ( From December 26, 2015 to September 7, 2016)
 General Reda Mohamed Farahat. ( From September 9, 2016 to February 16, 2017)
 Dr. Mohamed Ali Sultan. ( From February 16, 2017 to August 30, 2018)
 Dr. Abdul Aziz Qansua. ( From August 30, 2018 to present)

Transportation

Ports 
 Alexandria Port
 Al Dekheila Port. ( The second largest port in Alexandria Governorate after Alexandria Port).
 Abu Qir Port
 Eastern Port. ( One of the oldest ports as it was built in 2000 B.C in Racoda village to serve the coastal area in the 'Pharos Island').

Railroads 
 Alexandria Tram
 Alexandria Railways

Airports 
Alexandria Governorate has one international airport:
 Borg El Arab Airport.

References

External links
 Alexandria Governorate Page in English
 Miscellaneous 1997 statistical information on Alexandria
 El Wattan News of Alexandria Governorate

 
Governorates of Egypt